Hjördis "Disa" Eythorsdottir (born 24 July 1965) is an Iceland-born American bridge player. She is from Reykjavik.

Eythorsdottir was stripped of a silver medal at the 2002 world championships in Montreal for refusing to take a drug test covering substances banned by the IOC.

Eythorsdottir claims she was on a prescription diet drug connected with a back condition.  She had asked the authorities if the drug was banned. She did not have a certificate to cover the prescription.

Bridge accomplishments

Wins
 North American Bridge Championships (9)
 Smith Life Master Women's Pairs (1) 2010 
 Machlin Women's Swiss Teams (3) 1994, 1998, 2000 
 Wagar Women's Knockout Teams (1) 2012 
 Keohane North American Swiss Teams (1) 2006 
 Sternberg Women's Board-a-Match Teams (3) 1994, 2001, 2002

Runners-up
 North American Bridge Championships (13)
 Whitehead Women's Pairs (1) 2009 
 Smith Life Master Women's Pairs (1) 1997 
 Grand National Teams (1) 1997 
 Machlin Women's Swiss Teams (2) 2010, 2012 
 Wagar Women's Knockout Teams (3) 2008, 2010, 2011 
 Sternberg Women's Board-a-Match Teams (3) 2000, 2007, 2008 
 Chicago Mixed Board-a-Match (2) 2001, 2003

References

External links
 
 

1965 births
American contract bridge players
Disa Eythorsdottir
Living people
Place of birth missing (living people)
Finnish expatriate sportspeople in the United States